The 2015–16 AHL season was the 80th season of the American Hockey League. The regular season began on October 9, 2015, and ended on April 17, 2016. The 2016 Calder Cup playoffs follow the conclusion of the regular season. An attendance record was set with a league average of 5,982 spectators per game, surpassing the record set in 2004–05.

Regular season

On May 12, 2015, the AHL unveiled a new, major realignment of its conferences and divisions for the 2015–16 season, a move made as a result of the relocations of seven franchises, including five teams moving to California, one to Manitoba, and one to Newfoundland and Labrador.  Mirroring a change the National Hockey League had taken prior to its 2013–14 season, the AHL moved back to having four divisions of seven or eight teams. The Eastern Conference consists of the Atlantic and North Divisions, while the Western Conference consists of the Central and Pacific Divisions.

On June 13, the league commissioner, David Andrews, disclosed that the five California teams would each play 68-game schedule; the other 25 teams (including the two Texas-based teams that share the Pacific division with the California teams) would play 76 games apiece.  The implementation of an unbalanced format was seen as a way to ease the California teams' travel costs as well as reducing stretches of 3 games in 3 nights, which can impede player development and hamper attractive forms of play.

To alleviate the 68/76-game imbalance, the AHL began using an alternative method of ranking its teams and determining playoff seeds.  As before, standings points are still awarded (two points for a win, one point for an overtime or shootout loss, none for a regulation loss) but rather than ranking teams by the total number of points earned, they are positioned by their points percentage, determined as the number of points earned divided by points available to them.  For example, a team earning one win and one overtime loss after two games would have a .750 points percentage (3 points earned divided by 4 points available).

In support of the new division, the AHL played an outdoor game called the Golden State Hockey Rush at Raley Field in West Sacramento, California on December 18, 2015. The Stockton Heat defeated the Bakersfield Condors 3–2 in front of 9,357 fans.

Team and NHL affiliation changes

Relocations

Under a plan approved by the league on January 29, 2015, the league established a Pacific Division, with five teams based in the state of California. All five teams are affiliated with NHL franchises based in western North America. In the season prior to the realignment, the league had no teams west of Texas (and only one western team, the Abbotsford Heat, had played in the AHL in the five seasons prior to that), causing call-up issues for western NHL teams. In return, the three ECHL franchises already based in the cities where the AHL franchises were relocated, went east and took the place of AHL teams that had left those cities.

On March 12, 2015, the AHL announced that the True North Sports & Entertainment-owned franchise, the St. John's IceCaps, was relocating back to Winnipeg, Manitoba, to make it easier for their NHL team, the Winnipeg Jets, to call-up players. In order to fulfill their arena contact in St. John's, they negotiated with the Montreal Canadiens to move the Hamilton Bulldogs to St. John's and take on the IceCaps identity; in turn, the Bulldogs fulfilled their arena obligation by transferring their lease and intellectual property rights to the former Belleville Bulls, a junior hockey team.

The franchise changes for the 2015–16 season are listed as follows:
The Adirondack Flames relocated to Stockton, California, to become the Stockton Heat as part of a new Pacific Division. The Calgary Flames purchased the ECHL's Stockton Thunder and relocated the team to replace the Adirondack Flames in Glens Falls as the Adirondack Thunder.
The Hamilton Bulldogs relocated to St. John's, Newfoundland and Labrador, and took on the identity of the St. John's IceCaps. The Montreal Canadiens purchased the Bulldogs franchise from Michael Andlauer prior to the announcement of the relocation. Andlauer purchased an Ontario Hockey League franchise to replace the AHL team and gave it the same name.
The Manchester Monarchs relocated to Ontario, California, to become the Ontario Reign as part of a new Pacific Division. The franchise swapped places with the Ontario Reign of the ECHL as both franchises were owned and operated by the Los Angeles Kings.
The Norfolk Admirals relocated to San Diego, California, to become the San Diego Gulls as part of a new Pacific Division. The Admirals franchise was purchased by the Anaheim Ducks as their owned and operated AHL team.
On December 18, 2014, the Oklahoma City Barons announced it would cease operations at the end of the 2014–15 season after the Barons' management failed to come to an extended affiliation agreement with their NHL affiliate and franchise owner, the Edmonton Oilers. On January 29, 2015, it was announced the franchise would establish a new team in Bakersfield, California, to become the Bakersfield Condors as part of the new Pacific Division. Unlike the Barons, the Condors are owned and operated by the Oilers organization. The Condors replaced the Oilers' ECHL team of the same name who relocated to Norfolk and took on the Norfolk Admirals identity in the ECHL.
The franchise owned by the Winnipeg Jets that played as the St. John's IceCaps since the 2011–12 season, relocated back to Winnipeg, Manitoba, to play in the same arena as its parent club and returned to its previous identity as the Manitoba Moose.
The Worcester Sharks relocated to San Jose, California, to become the San Jose Barracuda as part of the new Pacific Division and share the SAP Center with its parent club, the San Jose Sharks.

Affiliation changes

Rule changes

Overtime
During the regular season, the sudden-death overtime period is reduced to five minutes (5:00) in length but full playing strength is 3-on-3 (plus goaltenders) for the entire period. Overtime will be preceded by a "dry scrape" of the entire ice surface. Teams will change ends at the start of overtime. If the game is still tied following overtime, a winner will be determined by a three-player shootout.

This change mimics the change made in the National Hockey League for the 2015–16 season. In the previous season, the AHL first experimented with 3-on-3 overtime but had three minutes of 4-on-4 play before reducing the number of players on the ice. This change caused 75 percent of games tied at the end of regulation to end in overtime in the 2014–15 season. This was reduced from just 35 percent in the 2013–14 season, decreasing the number of games decided by shootout.

Video Review
A team may use a "coach's challenge" to initiate an official video review; only those situations which are subject to review by rule may be challenged. A team may only request a coach's challenge if it has its timeout available, and the coach's challenge must be effectively initiated prior to the resumption of play. If the coach's challenge does not result in the original call on the ice being overturned, the team exercising such challenge will be charged with a timeout. This change is identical to the rule change implemented by the NHL for its 2015–16 season.

Face-offs
For face-offs conducted on any of the 8 face-off dots outside center ice, the defending team's player (i.e. the player closer to his team's goal) shall place his stick on the ice first, followed immediately by the attacking team's player.  For face-offs at the center ice dot, the order of stick placement shall proceed as before, with the player from the visiting team placing his stick on the ice first, followed immediately by the home team's player.  This rule change mirrors one the NHL also implemented for 2015–16; previously in both leagues, the visiting team's player placed his stick on the ice first regardless of the face-off location.

Playoff format
The 2016 playoff format changed as a result of the realignment and unbalanced regular season schedules. The new playoff format was finalized at the Annual Board of Governors meeting that took place July 6–9, 2015. During the regular season, teams receive two points for a win and one point for an overtime or shootout loss. The top four teams in each division ranked by points percentage (points earned divided by points available) qualify for the 2016 Calder Cup Playoffs, with one exception in each conference: if the fifth-place team in the Atlantic or Central Division finishes with a better points percentage than the fourth-place team in the North or Pacific Division, it would cross over and compete in the other division's bracket.

The 2016 Calder Cup Playoffs will feature a divisional playoff format, leading to conference finals and ultimately the Calder Cup Finals. The division semifinals are best-of-five series; all subsequent rounds are best-of-seven.

Standings 
 indicates team has clinched division and a playoff spot
 indicates team has clinched a playoff spot
 indicates team has been eliminated from playoff contention

Eastern Conference 
Updated as of April 17, 2016

Western Conference 
Updated as of April 17, 2016

Statistical leaders

Leading skaters 
The following players are sorted by points, then goals. Updated as of April 17, 2016.

GP = Games played; G = Goals; A = Assists; Pts = Points; +/– = Plus-minus; PIM = Penalty minutes

Leading goaltenders 
The following goaltenders with a minimum 1500 minutes played lead the league in goals against average. Updated as of April 16, 2016.

GP = Games played; TOI = Time on ice (in minutes); SA = Shots against; GA = Goals against; SO = Shutouts; GAA = Goals against average; SV% = Save percentage; W = Wins; L = Losses; OT = Overtime/shootout loss

Calder Cup playoffs

AHL awards

All-Star teams
First All-Star team
Peter Budaj (G) – Ontario
T. J. Brennan (D) – Toronto
Brandon Montour (D) – San Diego
Chris Bourque (F) – Hershey
Seth Griffith (F) – Providence
Frank Vatrano (F) – Providence

Second All-Star team
Matt Murray (G) – Wilkes-Barre/Scranton
Will O'Neill (D) – Wilkes-Barre/Scranton
Robbie Russo (D) – Grand Rapids
Dustin Jeffrey (F) – Springfield/Wilkes-Barre/Scranton
Mikko Rantanen (F) – San Antonio
Mike Sislo (F) – Albany

All-Rookie Team
Juuse Saros (G) – Milwaukee
Brandon Montour (D) – San Diego
Robbie Russo (D) – Grand Rapids
Austin Czarnik (F) – Providence
Mikko Rantanen (F) – San Antonio
Frank Vatrano (F) – Providence

Milestones

See also
List of AHL seasons
2015 in ice hockey
2016 in ice hockey

References

External links
AHL official site

 
American Hockey League seasons
2015–16 in American ice hockey by league
2015–16 in Canadian ice hockey by league